Vlastimil Stožický (born 19 August 1983) is a Czech football midfielder who currently plays for FK Viktoria Žižkov.

Spartak Trnava 
In May 2012, he joined Slovak club Spartak Trnava on a two-year contract.

References

External links 
 
 

Czech footballers
1983 births
Living people
Association football midfielders
FK Teplice players
FK Jablonec players
FK Baník Most players
FC Baník Ostrava players
FC Spartak Trnava players
Czech First League players
Expatriate footballers in Slovakia
People from Varnsdorf
Sportspeople from the Ústí nad Labem Region